Katzenelnbogen is a former Verbandsgemeinde ("collective municipality") in the Rhein-Lahn-Kreis, in Rhineland-Palatinate, Germany. Its seat was in Katzenelnbogen. On 1 July 2019, it was merged into the new Verbandsgemeinde Aar-Einrich.

The Verbandsgemeinde Katzenelnbogen consisted of the following Ortsgemeinden ("local municipalities"):

Former Verbandsgemeinden in Rhineland-Palatinate
Rhein-Lahn-Kreis